The Men's 100 metre butterfly competition at the 2019 World Championships was held on 26 and 27 July 2019. The defending champion Caeleb Dressel broke Michael Phelps' ten-year-old record by 0.32 second in the semi-final, setting a new world-record time of 49.50 seconds. Dressel won the final held the following day, defending his title.

Records
Prior to the competition, the existing world and championship records were as follows.

The following new records were set during this competition.

Results

Heats
The heats were held on 26 July at 10:00.

Semifinals
The semifinals were held on 26 July at 20:10.

Semifinal 1

Semifinal 2

Final
The final was started on 27 July at 20:43.

References

Men's 100 metre butterfly